21st London Film Critics Circle Awards
15 February 2001

Film of the Year: 
 Being John Malkovich 

British Film of the Year: 
 Billy Elliot 

The 21st London Film Critics Circle Awards, honouring the best in film for 2000, were announced by the London Film Critics Circle on 15 February 2001.

Winners and nominees

Film of the Year
 Being John Malkovich 
Crouching Tiger, Hidden Dragon
Gladiator
Memento
O Brother, Where Art Thou?

British Film of the Year
 Billy Elliot 
Chicken Run
The End of the Affair
The House of Mirth
Topsy-Turvy

Foreign Language Film of the Year
 Crouching Tiger, Hidden Dragon • Taiwan/Hong Kong/United States/China
Beau Travail • France
The Color of Paradise • Iran
Harry, He's Here to Help • France
In the Mood for Love • Hong Kong

Director of the Year
Spike Jonze – Being John Malkovich 
Mary Harron – American Psycho
Philip Kaufman – Quills
Ang Lee – Crouching Tiger, Hidden Dragon
Steven Soderbergh – Erin Brockovich

British Director of the Year
Stephen Daldry – Billy Elliot 
Terence Davies – The House of Mirth
Mike Leigh – Topsy-Turvy
Christopher Nolan – Memento
Ridley Scott – Gladiator

Screenwriter of the Year
Charlie Kaufman – Being John Malkovich 
Cameron Crowe – Almost Famous
Paul Thomas Anderson – Magnolia
Joel Coen & Ethan Coen – O Brother, Where Art Thou?
Steve Kloves – Wonder Boys

British Screenwriter of the Year
Christopher Nolan – Memento 
Lee Hall – Billy Elliot
Neil Jordan – The End of the Affair
Anthony Minghella – The Talented Mr. Ripley
Mike Leigh – Topsy-Turvy

Actor of the Year
'Russell Crowe – Gladiator and The InsiderJim Carrey- How the Grinch Stole Christmas and Man on the Moon
John Cusack – Being John Malkovich
Michael Douglas – Wonder Boys
Philip Seymour Hoffman – Almost Famous and Flawless

Actress of the YearJulia Roberts – Erin Brockovich Gillian Anderson – The House of Mirth
Julianne Moore – The End of the Affair
Hilary Swank – Boys Don't Cry
Renée Zellweger – Nurse Betty

British Actor of the YearJim Broadbent – Topsy-Turvy Christian Bale – American Psycho
Ralph Fiennes – The End of the Affair
Anthony Hopkins – Titus
Gary Lewis – Billy Elliot

British Actress of the YearJulie Walters – Billy Elliot Brenda Blethyn – Saving Grace
Janet McTeer – Tumbleweeds
Emily Watson – The Luzhin Defence
Kate Winslet – Quills

British Supporting Actor of the YearAlbert Finney – Erin Brockovich Michael Caine – Quills
Jason Isaacs – The Patriot
Jude Law – The Talented Mr. Ripley
Timothy Spall – Topsy-Turvy

British Supporting Actress of the YearSamantha Morton – Sweet and Lowdown Shirley Henderson- Topsy-Turvy
Lesley Manville – Topsy-Turvy
Sophie Thompson – Relative Values
Emily Watson – Cradle Will Rock

British Newcomer of the YearJamie Bell – Billy Elliot Paul Bettany – Gangster No. 1
Stephen Daldry – Billy Elliot
Lee Hall – Billy Elliot
Michael Legge – Angela's Ashes

British Producer of the YearGreg Brenman and Jonathan Finn – Billy Elliot 'Peter Lord, Nick Park, David Sproxton – Chicken RunNorma Heyman – Gangster No. 1Olivia Stewart – The House of MirthSimon Channing-Williams – Topsy-Turvy''

Dilys Powell Award
Richard Harris

External links
IMDB
Official Website

References

2
2000 film awards
2000 in London
2000 in British cinema
February 2001 events in the United Kingdom